Nabil Dafi (born 26 January 1982) is a French footballer who last played for Borussia Neunkirchen. Dafi, who plays as a defensive midfielder, has spent much of career in Germany. After spells with FSV Oggersheim and Borussia Neunkirchen, he joined 1. FC Saarbrücken in 2008, and helped the club achieve consecutive promotions, from the Oberliga Südwest to the Regionalliga West and onward to the 3. Liga. He made his first appearance at this level in the penultimate game of the 2010–11 season, replacing Nico Zimmermann in a win against SV Babelsberg 03. He was released at the end of the season and returned to Borussia Neunkirchen.

References

External links

1982 births
Living people
1. FC Saarbrücken players
SV Elversberg players
3. Liga players
Association football midfielders
Borussia Neunkirchen players
German footballers